Fabiola Chiara Candosin Marchetti (born 31 March 1970) in Caracas, Venezuela) (die 2019/02/27 in Padua, Italy ) was a Venezuelan Civil Engineer (Universidad Santa Maria 1995, Colegio de Ingenieros de Venezuela 1995), who also participated in her country's national beauty pageant Miss Venezuela as Miss Distrito Federal, obtaining the title of "Miss World Venezuela".

She was the official representative of her country to the Miss World 1989 pageant held in Hong Kong on November 22, 1989.

References

External links
 Miss Venezuela official website
 Miss World official website

Living people
People from Caracas
Miss World 1989 delegates
Miss Venezuela World winners
1970 births